Peter Nielsen (22 January 1890 – 26 January 1972) was a Danish sports shooter. He competed in the men's 50 metre pistol event at the 1912 Summer Olympics.

References

External links
 

1890 births
1972 deaths
Danish male sport shooters
Olympic shooters of Denmark
Shooters at the 1912 Summer Olympics
People from Helsingør
Sportspeople from the Capital Region of Denmark